Düsseldorf II is an electoral constituency (German: Wahlkreis) represented in the Bundestag. It elects one member via first-past-the-post voting. Under the current constituency numbering system, it is designated as constituency 107. It is located in western North Rhine-Westphalia, comprising the southern part of the city of Düsseldorf.

Düsseldorf II was created for the inaugural 1949 federal election. Since 2021, it has been represented by Andreas Rimkus of the Social Democratic Party (SPD).

Geography
Düsseldorf II is located in western North Rhine-Westphalia. As of the 2021 federal election, it comprises the southern part of the independent city of Düsseldorf, specifically districts 3, 8, 9, and 10.

History
Düsseldorf I was created in 1949. In the 1949 election, it was North Rhine-Westphalia constituency 20 in the numbering system. From 1953 through 1961, it was number 79. From 1965 through 1998, it was number 75. From 2002 through 2009, it was number 108. Since 2013, it has been number 107.

Originally, the constituency comprised the modern districts 2, 6 (excluding Lichtenbroich and Unterrath), 7 (excluding Hubbelrath and Knittcool), 8 (excluding Unterbach, 9, 10, and Düsseldorf-Oberbilk from 3. From 1965 through 1976, it comprised districts 6 (excluding Lichtenbroich and Unterrath), 7 (excluding Hubbelrath and Knittcool), 8 (excluding Unterbach), as well as Flingern from 2 and Oberbilk from 3. It acquired its current borders in the 1980 election.

Members
The constituency was first represented by Josef Gockeln of the Christian Democratic Union (CDU) from 1949 to 1953. He was succeeded by fellow CDU member Johannes Caspers from 1953 to 1961, followed by Georg Schulhoff until 1965. Helmut Lenders of the Social Democratic Party (SPD) was elected in 1965 and served until 1980. Manfred Geßner of the SPD then served a single term. The SPD retained the seat in 1983 with candidate Volker Jung, who served until 2002. He was succeeded by Karin Kortmann from 2002 to 2009. Beatrix Philipp of the CDU became representative in the 2009 election, and was succeeded by Sylvia Pantel in 2013. Andreas Rimkus regained the constituency for the SPD in 2021.

Election results

2021 election

2017 election

2013 election

2009 election

References

Federal electoral districts in North Rhine-Westphalia
Düsseldorf
Constituencies established in 1949
1949 establishments in West Germany